The South American section of the 2022 FIFA World Cup qualification acted as qualifiers for the 2022 FIFA World Cup, to be held in Qatar, for national teams which are members of the South American Football Confederation (CONMEBOL). A total of 4.5 slots (4 direct slots and 1 inter-confederation play-off slot) in the final tournament were available for CONMEBOL teams.

The qualification process began on 8 October 2020 and ended on 29 March 2022. Uruguay's Luis Suárez scored the first goal of the round-robin. This was the third time Suárez had opened scoring in the group (after 2010 and 2014), as well as the fourth consecutive time a Uruguayan player had done so (Martín Cáceres scored the first goal of the 2018 process).

Format
On 24 January 2019, the CONMEBOL Council decided to maintain the same qualification structure used for the previous six tournaments. The ten teams play in a league of home-and-away round-robin matches.

The fixtures were determined by a draw which was held on 17 December 2019, 10:00 PYST (UTC−3), at the Bourbon Asunción Convention Hotel in Luque, Paraguay.

Originally, Brazil and Argentina were both to be drawn into either position 4 or 5 in the draw, thus ensuring that no team has to play both of them on any double matchday. However, the decision was later reversed on 16 November 2019 by the CONMEBOL Council, making the draw completely open.

The CONMEBOL Council approved the use of the video assistant referee system for the qualifiers.

Entrants
All 10 national teams from CONMEBOL entered qualification.

Note: Bolded teams qualified for the World Cup. Peru advanced to the inter-confederation play-offs.

Schedule
The qualifying matches are played on dates that fall within the FIFA International Match Calendar. There are a total of 18 matchdays. Originally eight matchdays would be in 2020 and ten would be in 2021.

On 12 March 2020, FIFA announced that matches on matchdays 1–2 due to take place in March 2020 were postponed due to the COVID-19 pandemic, with the new dates to be confirmed.

On 25 June 2020, FIFA announced that the inter-confederation play-offs, originally scheduled to be played in March 2022, were moved to June 2022.

On 10 July 2020, FIFA announced that the CONMEBOL qualifiers in September 2020 were postponed, with the qualifiers starting in October 2020. CONMEBOL also requested FIFA to include a replacement international window in January 2022 in order to complete the qualifiers in March 2022. The proposal was approved by FIFA on 18 August 2020. On 6 March 2021, FIFA announced that the March 2021 matches (matchdays 5 and 6) were postponed due to travel and quarantine restrictions caused by the COVID-19 pandemic. These matches were rescheduled to be played in September and October 2021 after FIFA accepted the CONMEBOL's request to allow triple matchdays in both September and October international windows. Matchday 5 was played between matchdays 11 and 12, while matchday 6 was played between matchdays 9 and 10.

Standings

Matches

Matchday 1

Matchday 2

Matchday 3

Matchday 4

Matchday 7

Matchday 8

Matchday 9

Matchday 6
Matchday pushed back in revised schedule and then cancelled.

Matchday 10

Matchday 11

Matchday 5
Matchday pushed back in revised schedule.

Matchday 12

Matchday 13

Matchday 14

Matchday 15

Matchday 16

Matchday 17

Matchday 18

Replay from matchday 6

Inter-confederation play-off

The inter-confederation play-off was determined by a draw held on 26 November 2021. The fifth-placed team from CONMEBOL was drawn against the AFC fourth round winners. The play-off was played as a single match in Qatar on 13 June 2022.

Qualified teams

The following four teams from CONMEBOL qualified for the final tournament.

1 Bold indicates champions for that year. Italic indicates hosts for that year.

Goalscorers

Notes

References

External links

Qualifiers – South America Matches: Round-robin, FIFA.com

FIFA World Cup qualification (CONMEBOL)
 
2020 in South American football
2021 in South American football
2022 in South American football
FIFA World Cup qualification (CONMEBOL)
FIFA World Cup qualification (CONMEBOL)
FIFA World Cup qualification (CONMEBOL)
FIFA World Cup qualification (CONMEBOL)
FIFA World Cup qualification (CONMEBOL)
FIFA World Cup qualification (CONMEBOL)
FIFA World Cup qualification (CONMEBOL)
FIFA World Cup qualification (CONMEBOL)
FIFA World Cup qualification (CONMEBOL)
FIFA World Cup qualification (CONMEBOL)
FIFA World Cup qualification (CONMEBOL), 2020
Argentina at the 2022 FIFA World Cup
Brazil at the 2022 FIFA World Cup
Ecuador at the 2022 FIFA World Cup
Uruguay at the 2022 FIFA World Cup